is a Japanese professional boxer. He held the IBF super-bantamweight title from 2017 to 2018 and the interim version from 2019 to April 2021. He also challenged from the unified WBA (Super) and IBF super-bantamweight titles in April 2021.

Career
Iwasa turned pro in 2008, after winning national titles as an amateur and accruing a 60–6 record. Iwasa was considered a highly touted prospect until he lost a bout for the Japanese bantamweight title against future world champion Shinsuke Yamanaka. Iwasa would eventually win that title, as well as the OPBF title.

Iwasa's first world title fight would come against Lee Haskins for the interim IBF bantamweight title in June 2015. Iwasa would be stopped in round 6 after being knocked down by a left hook from Haskins. Following that loss, Iwasa moved to the super bantamweight division.

In his fifth fight at that weight, Iwasa defeated Yukinori Oguni for the IBF super bantamweight title. Iwasa battered the defending champion, dropping him three times before the fight was stopped in round 6.

In his first title defense, Iwasa faced Ernesto Saulong. Iwasa retained his IBF super bantamweight title for the first time, via unanimous decision.

His second title defense came against Irishman T. J. Doheny. Doheny was the busier man on the night, outjabbing Iwasa for most of the fight. However, Iwasa seemed to be more precise and causing more visible damage to Doheny. Even to Doheny's slight surprise, all three judges scored the fight in his favor, leaving Iwasa without his belt in only his second defense.

Iwasa bounced back in the next fight, called as an IBF final eliminator, by defeating Cesar Juarez via technical decision. Both fighters clashed heads in the second round that opened cuts for both, but it was Juarez who took more damage in the remainder of the fight. The fight was called off in the tenth round, and since Iwasa was up on two of the scorecards, he got awarded the victory.

In his next fight, Iwasa fought Marlon Tapales for the interim IBF super bantamweight belt. Iwasa was ranked #1 by the IBF at the time, while Tapales was #3 at super bantamweight. Iwasa outboxed Tapales for most of the fight, before rocking him with a well-placed overhand left in the eleventh round. Tapales beat the count, but was stumbling when the referee asked if he could continue, which prompted the referee to stop the fight and award Iwasa the TKO win.

Professional boxing record

See also
List of world super-bantamweight boxing champions
List of Japanese boxing world champions
Boxing in Japan

References

External links

Ryosuke Iwasa - Profile, News Archive & Current Rankings at Box.Live

1989 births
Living people
People from Kashiwa
Japanese male boxers
Sportspeople from Chiba Prefecture
Bantamweight boxers
Super-bantamweight boxers
World super-bantamweight boxing champions
International Boxing Federation champions